Mi·sumi may refer to:

Place names 
 Misumi, Shimane
 Misumi, Yamaguchi
 Misumi-machi, a town located in Uto District, Kumamoto, Japan
 Misumi Station
 Misumi Line
 Nagato-Misumi Station
 Miho-Misumi Station

People with the given name
, Japanese writer
, Japanese tennis player

People with the surname 
 Kenji Misumi
 Yoko Misumi
, Japanese indologist

Fictional characters:
 Nagisa Misumi
 Kaede Misumi

Companies 
 Misumi Group, a Japanese industrial group with global operations
 MISUMI USA, company part of the Japanese corporation Misumi Group

See also 
 Misu

Japanese feminine given names
Japanese-language surnames